Events from the year 1703 in Ireland.

Incumbent
Monarch: Anne

Events
June 11 – Charles Hickman is consecrated as Church of Ireland Bishop of Derry.
September 11 – a privateering expedition comprising the ships St George and Cinque Ports commanded by William Dampier leaves Kinsale for South America.
Parliament of Ireland assembles, the first under Anne, Queen of Great Britain, and the first for five years.
Popery Act (An Act to prevent the further Growth of Popery), enacted by the Parliament of Ireland, reintroduces gavelkind: when a Roman Catholic dies, his estate is to be divided equally among his sons (legitimate or otherwise) if they retain their Catholic faith.
Treason Act (Ireland) 1703, enacted by the Parliament of Ireland, enforces the Protestant line of succession to the British throne.
Sir Robert Doyne is appointed as Chief Justice of the Irish Common Pleas.
The Parliament of Ireland investigates the possibility of improving navigation on the rivers Shannon and Barrow and constructing a Newry Canal.

Births
January 22 (in France) – Antoine Walsh, slave trader and Jacobite (d. 1763 in San Domingo)
February 5 – Gilbert Tennent, Presbyterian pastor in Colonial America (d. 1764)
March 1 – Philip Tisdall, lawyer and politician (d. 1777)
September 29 – Philip Syng, silversmith (d. 1789 in the United States)
Arthur Gore, 1st Earl of Arran, politician (d. 1773)
John Ussher, politician (d. 1749)
Approximate date
John Blakeney, politician (d. 1747)
Samuel Boyse, poet (d. 1749)
Henry Brooke, novelist and dramatist (d. 1783)
George Faulkner, publisher and bookseller (d. 1775)

Deaths

References

 
Years of the 18th century in Ireland
Ireland
1700s in Ireland